The 2012–13 Football League is the second division of the Greek professional football system and the third season under the name Football League after previously being known as Beta Ethniki. Its regular season began on 28 September 2012 and will end on 9 June 2013. The promotion play-offs, are scheduled to take place after regular season.

Teams

 Ethnikos Gazoros' home 500-seater Gazoros Municipal Stadium doesn't meet Football League regulations.
 Kalloni's home 800-seater Kalloni Municipal Stadium doesn't meet Football League regulations.

Structure
At present, there are twenty one clubs that compete in the Football League, playing each other in a home and away series. At the end of the season, the bottom three teams are relegated to the Gamma Ethniki. The top three teams gain automatic promotion. However, teams positioned fourth to seventh take part in a promotion play-off. Unlike in Super League, clubs in the Football League do not get relegated if the club fails to obtain a license. All teams in the Football League take part in the Greek Football Cup.

League table

Results

Promotion play-offs
The promotion play-offs will comprise the teams ranked 3rd through 6th during the regular season, and they are scheduled to take place immediately after the conclusion of the regular season. Niki Volos started the playoffs with a one-point disadvantage, because of their worse position in contrast to the other teams, when the main season finished.

Top scorers

References

External links
Football league-Football league 2
news & stats

Second level Greek football league seasons
Greece
2